Troyes – Barberey Airport or Aéroport de Troyes - Barberey  is an airport located  northwest of Troyes in Barberey-Saint-Sulpice, both communes of the Aube département in the Champagne-Ardenne région of France.

Facilities

Airlines and destinations 
There are no services to and from Troyes since Danube Wings, the last remaining carrier, cancelled its seasonal service to Bastia in January 2013.

Statistics

References

External links 
 
 Aéroport de Troyes-Barberey page at CCI de Troyes et de l'Aube 
 Aéroport de Troyes - Barberey page at Union des Aéroports Français 
 

Airports in Grand Est
Buildings and structures in Aube
Airport
Transport in Grand Est
Airports established in 1933